This table displays the top-rated primetime television series of the 1966–67 season as measured by Nielsen Media Research.

References

1966 in American television
1967 in American television
1966-related lists
1967-related lists
Lists of American television series